"More with Less" is the first episode of the fifth season of the HBO original series The Wire. The episode was written by David Simon from a story by David Simon & Ed Burns and was directed by Joe Chappelle. It originally aired on January 6, 2008.

Plot

Mayor Tommy Carcetti's plan to rejuvenate the Baltimore Police Department has been halted by funding cuts necessitated by the city's education deficit. Carcetti and Council President Nerese Campbell meet with a Republican U.S. Attorney who promises to lend a dozen FBI agents to the BPD in exchange for the city allowing the investigation into the corrupt State Senator Clay Davis to be made a federal case. Carcetti fears that the U.S. Attorney will use the case to discredit the Democrats, while Campbell sees State's Attorney Rupert Bond's case against Davis as a means of eventually running for mayor. Carcetti's cuts cause the Major Crimes Unit (MCU) to shut down, effectively ending the investigation into the vacant murders. Detectives Lester Freamon and Leander Sydnor take over the Davis investigation.

Colonel Cedric Daniels is outraged that City Hall is prioritizing Davis over 22 murders. Detective Jimmy McNulty, having already fallen back into his old habits of alcoholism and infidelity while working in the MCU, is despondent upon his return to Homicide. In the Western District, Sergeant Ellis Carver struggles to keep up morale following pay cuts. Herc is now working as an investigator for defense attorney Maurice Levy. Marlo Stanfield intimidates other drug dealers into buying his product and causes unrest in the New Day Co-Op. He gets Chris Partlow to find Sergei Malatov as a connection to the Co-Ops' suppliers. Partlow visits the courthouse, where he unwittingly approaches Daniels, Bond, and Rhonda Pearlman to ask for directions. Michael Lee is acting as an enforcer under Partlow, while his friend and cohabitant Duquan "Dukie" Weems runs their drug dealing crew. Dukie has not gained the respect of the crew, and Michael suggests paying him for looking after his younger brother Bug instead.

The Baltimore Sun also faces budget cuts, but editor Augustus "Gus" Haynes remains principled and efficient. The Sun breaks a story about Campbell's relocation of drug dealer Ricardo "Fat-Face Rick" Hendrix's strip club out of a redeveloping neighborhood at a considerable cost to the city budget, linking the plan to campaign contributions from Hendrix and Campbell's associates. Ambitious reporter Scott Templeton remains dissatisfied while his colleague Alma Gutierrez, who got a choice quote from Hendrix for the story, is happy with her work. Bubbles lives in his sister's basement and no longer uses drugs, but leaves each evening that his sister is assigned to night shift, as she does not trust him enough to leave him alone in her house. He works as a rush hour distributor for the Sun to commuters. He sells a copy to Campbell, who is outraged by the Hendrix story.

Production

Guest stars

Frankie Faison as Ervin Burrell
Amy Ryan as Beatrice "Beadie" Russell
Marlyne Afflack as Nerese Campbell
Robert F. Chew as Proposition Joe
Delaney Williams as Jay Landsman
Felicia Pearson as Felicia "Snoop" Pearson
Duane Rawlings as Hungry Man
Troj Marquis Strickland as Ricardo "Fatface Rick" Hendrix
Anwan Glover as Slim Charles
David Costabile as Thomas Klebanow
Sam Freed as James Whiting
Dion Graham as Rupert Bond
Bruce Kirkpatrick as Roger Twigg
Jay Landsman as Dennis Mello
Ed Norris as Ed Norris
Method Man as Melvin "Cheese" Wagstaff
Joseph Urla as Maryland District US Attorney
Gregory L. Williams as Michael Crutchfield
William F. Zorzi as Bill Zorzi
Bobby J. Brown as Bobby Brown
Benjamin Busch as Anthony Colicchio
Rick Otto as Kenneth Dozerman
Ryan Sands as Lloyd "Truck" Garrick
Ron Tucker as Unknown
Thomas J. McCarthy as Tim Phelps
Donald Neal as Jay Spry
Robert Poletick as Steven Luxenberg
Kara Quick as Rebecca Corbett
Todd Scofield as Jeff Price
Eisa Davis as Bubbles' Sister
Gil Deeble as Hucklebuck
Edward Green as Spider
Dante Painter, Jr. as DeShawn
Corbin Smith as Monell
Peter Linari as Pete the Bartender
Laura Lippman as Laura Lippman
Michael Olesker as Michael Olesker
Gene Terinoni as Jimmy Asher
Brandon Young as Mike Fletcher
Lee Everett Cox as Aaron Castor
Dennis Hill as Detective Christeson
Juhahn Jones as Drug Dealer
Brian E. McLarney as Officer Brian McLarney
Jermaine Shorts as Unknown
Jay Spadaro as Officer

Lee Everett Cox and David Costabile's names are misspelled in the credits as Lee Evertt Cox and David Costible, respectively.

Uncredited appearances

Mike D. Anderson as Ghost
Keenon Brice as Bug
Darrell Britt-Gibson as O-Dog
Chris Clanton as Savino Bratton
Thuliso Dingwall as Kenard

First appearances

Gus Haynes - a veteran of The Baltimore Sun and city desk editor
Scott Templeton - reporter
Alma Gutierrez - reporter
James Whiting - the paper's Executive Editor
Thomas Klebanow - the paper's Managing Editor
Steven Luxenberg - the paper's Metro Desk Editor
Tim Phelps - the paper's State Desk Editor
Rebecca Corbett - the paper's Regional Affairs Editor
Jay Spry - veteran rewrite man
Roger Twigg - long-serving reporter
Mike Fletcher - young general assignments reporter
Det. Christeson - new member of the homicide unit who has McNulty's old desk

References

External links
"More with Less" at HBO.com

The Wire (season 5) episodes
2008 American television episodes
Television episodes written by David Simon